Isabella "Bella" Kresche (born 28 November 1998) is an Austrian professional footballer who plays as a goalkeeper for Italian Serie A club US Sassuolo and the Austria women's national team, which she represents since 2022.

Life
Kresche was born in Graz in 1998. She began learning about goalkeeping at Roland Goriupp's camps, and then at the National Center for Women's Football, where she learned from former goalkeeper Reinhard Dietl.

After graduating from high school in 2017, she studied business administration at the Vienna University of Economics and Business and graduated with a bachelor's degree.

She has been playing for the Austrian national team since 2022 as a goalkeeper. She made her debut in a friendly match against Romania in February where the team won six goals to one. She was invited to join the squad for the 2022 European Football Championship by Irene Fuhrmann, Manuela Zinsberger and Jasmin Pal.

References

External links 
 
 

1998 births
Living people
Footballers from Graz
Women's association football goalkeepers
FSK St. Pölten-Spratzern players
Austrian women's footballers
Expatriate women's footballers in Italy
Austrian expatriate sportspeople in Italy
Austrian expatriate women's footballers